Resource efficiency is the maximising of the supply of money, materials, staff, and other assets that can be drawn on by a person or organization in order to function effectively, with minimum wasted (natural) resource expenses. It means using the Earth's limited resources in a sustainable manner while minimising environmental impact.

Motivation
A 2014 report by The Carbon Trust suggested that resource challenges are intensifying rapidly – for example, there could be a 40% gap between available water supplies and water needs by 2030, and some critical materials could be in short supply as soon as 2016. These challenges could lead to disruptions to supply, growing regulatory requirements, volatile fluctuation of prices, and may ultimately threaten the viability of existing business models.

Related concepts
Resource efficiency measures, methods, and aims are quite similar to those of resource productivity/resource intensity and of the slightly more environment-inclined concept of ecological efficiency/eco-efficiency.

Energy efficiency

Possible approaches
To achieve and optimize natural resource and energy efficiency, several sustainable economical or production schemes have been proposed over the course of the last 50 years: circular economy, cradle-to-cradle- or regenerative design, as well as biomimetics principles, just to name a few. Common to all of them is built-in sustainability, in which (non-renewable) resource-wasting is ruled out by design. They are generally built to be holistic, robustly self-sustaining and respecting the carrying capacity of the economic or ecological system.

Resource use measurement and identification of hotspots
A key tool in resource efficiency is measuring different aspects of resource use (e.g. carbon footprint, water footprint, land footprint or material use), then identifying 'hot spots' where the most resources are used or where there are the best opportunities to reduce this resource use. For example, WRAP has published information on hotspots for 50 grocery products likely to contribute most to the environmental impacts associated with UK household consumption. 
WRAP have created a range of tools and guides to help improve business resource efficiency.

Initiatives and programmes

UNEP
UNEP works to promote resource efficiency and sustainable consumption and production (SCP) in both developed and developing countries. The focus is on achieving increased understanding and implementation by public and private decision makers, as well as civil society, of policies and actions for resource efficiency and SCP. This includes the promotion of sustainable resource management in a life cycle perspective for goods and services.

Europe 2020
The resource-efficient Europe flagship initiative is part of the Europe 2020 Strategy, the EU's growth strategy for a smart, inclusive and sustainable economy. It supports the shift towards sustainable growth via a resource-efficient, low-carbon economy.

Tomsk Polytechnic University

In October 2012 Tomsk Polytechnic University (TPU) launched the Development Program of Resource Efficient Technologies for the period 2013–2018. That program was presented by TPU in 2009 at the Russian federal competition  "National Research University". A key point of the program of TPU was announced the formation of high school as a world-class university-based staffing and development of technologies for resource-efficient economy.

TPU developed educational module "Resource Efficiency", prepared and published a textbook "Principals of resource efficiency", optional subject matter of the same name introduced in the curriculum (for all disciplines and areas of undergraduate).

TPU envisages university development in the field of resource-efficient technologies that unites six research and educational clusters:
Safe Environment
Non-destructive testing and diagnostics
Materials for extreme conditions
Domestic and industrial waste recycling
Sustainable Energy
High-temperature superconductivity technologies for energy production
Nuclear and hydrogen fuel of the new generation
Hybrid simulation in energy production
Resource-efficient generation
Medical Engineering
Bioengineering materials and technologies
Radiation technologies in bioengineering
Electrophysical biomedical complexes
Planet Resources
Resource-efficient use of mineral resources
Clear water
Green chemistry
Cognitive Systems and Telecommunications
Cognitive software and hardware systems
Wireless telecommunication systems and technologies
Social Science and Humanities in Engineering
Social science and humanities component of engineering
Mechanisms of technical innovations initiation and engineering forethought

Resource Efficient Scotland
Resource Efficient Scotland is a Scottish government-funded programme that helps businesses and the public and third sectors save money by using resources more efficiently.

See also
 Scarcity
 Natural resource management
 Water efficiency

References

Resources
Waste minimisation